In enzymology, a sucrose 6F-alpha-galactosyltransferase is an enzyme that catalyzes the chemical reaction

UDP-galactose + sucrose  UDP + 6F-alpha-D-galactosylsucrose

Thus, the two substrates of this enzyme are UDP-galactose and sucrose, whereas its two products are UDP and 6F-alpha-D-galactosylsucrose.

This enzyme belongs to the family of glycosyltransferases, specifically the hexosyltransferases.  The systematic name of this enzyme class is UDP-galactose:sucrose 6F-alpha-D-galactosyltransferase. Other names in common use include uridine diphosphogalactose-sucrose 6F-alpha-galactosyltransferase, UDPgalactose:sucrose 6fru-alpha-galactosyltransferase, and sucrose 6F-alpha-galactotransferase.

References

 

EC 2.4.1
Enzymes of unknown structure